Jandiala may refer to:
Jandiala, a village in Jalandhar district in the Indian state of Punjab.
Jandiala Guru, a town in the Amritsar district of Eastern Punjab (India)
Jandiala Sher Khan, a town of Sheikhupura District in the Punjab province of Pakistan